Vilsoni Hereniko (born October 13, 1954) is a Rotuman playwright, film director and academic. He was the writer and director of Rotuma's first ever (and so far only) feature film, The Land Has Eyes (Pear ta ma 'on maf).

Biography
Hereniko is a Rotuman, born in Mea village, Hapmak, Itu'ti'u District, Rotuma, Fiji. He was schooled in his native Rotuma, obtained a Bachelor of Arts  degree and a Graduate Certificate in Education from the University of the South Pacific in 1997, a Master's degree in Education at the University of Newcastle-upon-Tyne, and, in 1991, a PhD in literature and language at the University of the South Pacific. He is now a professor at the University of Hawai'i's Center for Pacific Islands Studies, where he teaches literature, theatre and film.

Career

Literary
Hereniko published his first plays in the mid-1970s, including Don't Cry Mama, A Child For Iva, Sera's Choice and The Monster. In 1997 he received the Elliott Cades Writing Award for his overall contributions to literature.

Film
Hereniko has served on the jury and selection committee of the Hawai‘i International Film Festival. The Land Has Eyes, set in his native Rotuma, was his first feature film, in 2004. It was presented at the Sundance Film Festival in 2004, and was Rotuma's official submission to the 2006 Academy Awards. It received the "Best Overall Entry" award at the 2005 Wairoa Maori Film Festival, and the "Best Dramatic Feature" award at the 2004 ImagineNATIVE Film and Media Arts Festival.

Filmography
 The Land Has Eyes (2004), Writer and Director

Bibliography
 Two Plays, 1987, 
 The monster and other plays, 1989, 
 The wicked cat, 1991, 
 Last virgin in paradise: A serious comedy, 1993, 
 Woven Gods: Female Clowns and Power in Rotuma, 1995, 
 Sina & Tinilau, 1997 (children's book), 
 Inside Out: Literature, Cultural Politics, and Identity in the New Pacific, 1999 (as co-editor),

References

External links
 Interview with Vilsoni Hereniko
 Biography on the website of the University of Hawai'i
 Biography on Rotuma.net

1954 births
Living people
Rotuman people
Fijian people of Rotuman descent
Fijian dramatists and playwrights
Fijian screenwriters
Fijian film directors
University of Hawaiʻi faculty
University of the South Pacific alumni
Alumni of Newcastle University